Stöckse is a municipality in the district of Nienburg, in Lower Saxony, Germany. It is situated in the forest "Krähe" between Langendamm and Steimbke.

Policy

Municipality Stöckse
The villages Stöckse and Wenden with district Lohe form the municipality (Gemeinde) Stöckse, part of collective municipality (Samtgemeinde) Steimbke.

Municipal council
The municipal council (Gemeinderat) Stöckse has 11 members elected and a mayor elected directly. Since the local elections on September 10, 2006, two parties and one selector's community (Wählergemeinschaft) represent it.
CDU - 6 seats
SPD - 2 seats
WG Stöckse - 3 seats

Culture

Theatre

In Stöckse there is an open-air theatre. The stage is situated in a short part of forest in the city of Stöckse and accommodates 700 visitors. The audience is amused with comedies and stories in Low German, and a children's theatre themed "children play for children". Furthermore, the open-air theatre is a favoured arena for many special events different typed. Supra-regional known the in 1951 formatted open-air theatre is since 1986, since the foundation of the registered association and the der accession to the Verband Deutscher Freilichtbühnen (VDF).

Sightseeing

There is the Stöckser See, a small lake. Worth seeing is the Giebichenstein, a large erratic dating from the Ice Age and the cairns from Bronze Age.

References

External links
 Open-air theatre Stöckse
 Homepage of the Samtgemeinde Steimbke
 Stöckser sport's club

Nienburg (district)